Sam Tan or Sam Tân may refer to:

 Fireman Sam (original Welsh title: Sam Tân), a children's animation series
 Sam Tan (politician), a former Singaporean politician